The 2017–18 Coupe de France preliminary rounds, Bretagne make up the qualifying football competition to decide which teams from the French Bretagne region take part in the main competition from the seventh round.

First round 
The matches in Bretagne were played 18 and 20 August 2017.

First round results: Bretagne

Second round 
These matches were played on 26 and 27 August 2017.

Second round results: Bretagne

Third round 
These matches were played on 9 and 10 September 2017.

Third round results: Bretagne

Fourth round 
These matches were played on 23 and 24 September 2017.

Fourth round results: Bretagne

Fifth round 
These matches were played on 7 and 8 October 2017.

Fifth round results: Bretagne

Sixth round 
These matches were played on 21 and 22 October 2017.

Sixth round results: Bretagne

References 

2017–18 Coupe de France